History of LSU Tigers football recruiting rankings - Rivals.com (Yahoo! Sports), Scouts Inc. (ESPN), 247Sports.com (CBS Sports), Scout.com (Scout Media)

Recruiting history

See also
LSU Tigers football
LSU Tigers and Lady Tigers

References

External links
 LSU Tigers football at LSUSports.net
 Rivals.com recruiting 
 Scouts Inc. recruiting
 24/7 recruiting
 Scout.com recruiting

LSU Tigers football recruiting history